Givira arbeloides is a moth in the family Cossidae. It is found in North America, where it has been recorded from Arizona, Arkansas, Louisiana, Mississippi and Texas. .

The wingspan is about 27 mm. Adults have been recorded on wing from April to October.

References
Notes

Sources
Natural History Museum Lepidoptera generic names catalog

Givira
Moths described in 1899